Congdü (Chinese: 充堆; Pinyin: Chōngduī) is a township in Nyalam County, the Tibet Autonomous Region of China. It lies at an altitude of 3,763 metres (12,349 feet). The village has a population of about 237.

See also
List of towns and villages in Tibet

Notes

Populated places in Shigatse
Township-level divisions of Tibet
Nyalam County